The 2015 Superliga Colombiana was the fourth edition of the Superliga Colombiana.

Santa Fe was the winner and qualified for the 2015 Copa Sudamericana.

Teams

Matches

First leg

Second leg

External links
Superliga Postobon
Superliga, Dimayor.com

References

Superliga Colombiana
Superliga Colombiana 2015
Superliga Colombiana 2015
Superliga Colombiana
Superliga Colombiana